Stosicia is a genus of minute sea snails, marine gastropod mollusks or micromollusks in the family Zebinidae.

Species
Species within the genus Stosicia include:
 Stosicia aberrans (C. B. Adams, 1850)
 Stosicia abnormis (G. Nevill & H. Nevill, 1875)
 Stosicia annulata (Dunker, 1859)
 †  Stosicia bandensis (Kókay, 1966)
 Stosicia bougei (Bavay, 1917)
 Stosicia bourguignati (Issel, 1869)
 † Stosicia buccinalis (Grateloup, 1828) 
 Stosicia chiltoni (Oliver, 1914)
 † Stosicia costata (Boettger, 1887) 
 Stosicia fernandezgarcesi Espinosa & Ortea, 2002
 Stosicia garciai Rolán, Férnández-Garcés & Lee, 2009
 Stosicia hedleyi (Tate, 1899)
 Stosicia hiloensis (Pilsbry & Vanatta, 1908)
 Stosicia houbricki Sleurs, 1996
 Stosicia incisa (Laseron, 1956)
 Stosicia lochi Sleurs, 1996
 Stosicia manikiensis Sleurs, 1996
 Stosicia mirabilis (Weinkauff, 1881)
 † Stosicia multicingulata (Boettger, 1887) 
 Stosicia paschalis (Melvill & Standen, 1901)
 † Stosicia semicostulata (Boettger, 1887) 
 Species brought into synonymy
 † Stosicia planaxoides (Grateloup, 1838): synonym of † Stosicia buccinalis (Grateloup, 1828) 
 Stosicia polytropa (Hedley, 1899): synonym of Stosicia mirabilis (Weinkauff, 1881)

References

 Brusina, S. 1870a. [Untitled]. Vjesnik Arheološkog muzeja u Zagrebu 1: 212-214
 Sleurs W.J.M. (1996) A revision of the Recent species of the genus Stosicia (Gastropoda: Rissoidae). Mededelingen van de Koninklijke Academie voor Wetenschappen, Letteren en Schone Kunsten van België, Klasse der Wetenschappen 58(1): 117-158, 19 pls.
  Ponder W. F. (1985) A review of the genera of the Rissoidae (Mollusca: Mesogastropoda: Rissoacea). Records of the Australian Museum supplement 4: 1-221.